Vadim Gennadyevich Ivanov (17 July 1943 – 6 November 1996) was a Soviet football player and a Russian coach.

Honours
 Soviet Top League winner: 1963, 1969.
 Soviet Cup winner: 1967, 1971.

International career
Ivanov played his only game for USSR on 28 April 1971 in a friendly exhibition against Bulgaria.

External links
  Profile

 

1943 births
People from Nizhny Tagil
1996 deaths
Soviet footballers
Association football defenders
Soviet Union international footballers
Russian footballers
Russian football managers
Soviet Top League players
FC Dynamo Moscow players
FC Spartak Moscow players
FC Dnipro players
FC Dnipro managers
SC Tavriya Simferopol managers
FC Dynamo Moscow managers
FC Yenisey Krasnoyarsk players
Sportspeople from Sverdlovsk Oblast